The 1991–92 Coppa Italia, the 45th Coppa Italia was an Italian Football Federation domestic cup competition won by Parma.

First round

Second round

Round of 16

Quarter-finals

Semi-finals

Final

First leg

Second leg

Parma won 2–1 on aggregate.

Top goalscorers

References
rsssf.com

Coppa Italia seasons
Coppa Italia
Coppa Italia